The 2022–23 Asia League Ice Hockey season is the 20th season of operation (18th season of play) of the Asia League Ice Hockey. The league returned after the past two seasons were canceled due to the COVID-19 pandemic.

The regular season began on 3 September 2022, when the East Hokkaido Cranes hosted HL Anyang.

Season changes
The Oji Eagles rebranded as Red Eagles Hokkaido back in 2021. The Daemyung Killer Whales folded in 2021. The Yokohama Grits make their league debut this season after their initial debut was postponed with the cancelation for the 2020–21 and 2021–22 seasons. 

On 2 August 2022, the league voted to remove PSK Sakhalin in protest to the Russian invasion of Ukraine. On 15 September 2022, Anyang Halla announced that they rebranded to HL Anyang.

Teams
Only five teams from the 2019–20 season returned for the 2022–23 season, with the addition of expansion side Yokohama Grits.

Regular season
The league's regular season began on 3 September 2022.

Standings

Results

Playoffs

Bracket

Statistics

Scoring leaders

The following shows the top ten players who led the league in points, at the conclusion of matches played on 11 December 2022.

Leading goaltenders
The following shows the top ten goaltenders who led the league in goals against average, provided that they have played at least 40% of their team's minutes, at the conclusion of matches played on 11 December 2022.

References 

Asia League Ice Hockey
Asia League Ice Hockey seasons
Asia
Asia
Asia